Graybird is a Trojan horse that hides its presence on compromised computers and downloads files from remote Web sites.
  
There are many variations of this virus such as Backdoor.Graybird.P (the most recently discovered variation).

It was discovered on September 3, 2003 and affects Windows 2000, Windows 95, Windows 98, Windows Me, Windows NT, Windows Server 2003, Windows XP, and Windows Vista.

References
 Graybird information provided by Symantec
 Graybird.P information provided by Symantec

Trojan horses